The men's 400 metres hurdles sprint competition of the athletics events at the 2011 Pan American Games took place between the 26 and 27 of October at the Telmex Athletics Stadium.  The defending Pan American Games champion was Adam Kunkel of Canada.

Records
Prior to this competition, the existing world and Pan American Games records were as follows:

Qualification
Each National Olympic Committee (NOC) was able to enter one athlete regardless if they had met the qualification standard.  To enter two entrants both athletes had to have met the minimum standard (52.0) in the qualifying period (January 1, 2010 to September 14, 2011).

Schedule

Results
All times shown are in seconds.

Semifinals
Held on October 26. The first two in each heat and the next two fastest advanced to the final.

Final
Held on October 27.

References

Athletics at the 2011 Pan American Games
2011